Jeff Whiting (born March 27, 1972) is an American theater director, choreographer, performer and entrepreneur. He has been involved in theatrical productions, concerts, operas and special events around the world. Whiting is also known for developing "Stage Write," an app that allows creation, duplication and editing of floorplan charts to facilitate stage choreography.

Biography 
Whiting was born in Denver, Colorado, the son of David L. Whiting and Bette Whiting (née Snelson). He was the third of five siblings. He grew up in Salt Lake City, Utah. At the age of 10, he was introduced to theater, dance, acting and singing, under Xan S. Johnson's tutoring at The University of Utah's Children's Theater program. In 1996 he received a Bachelor of Fine Arts in Music Dance Theater from Brigham Young University in Provo, Utah.

Whiting began his performing career  after graduation. He made his first professional appearance in 1996 as Quasimodo in Disney's Hunchback of Notre Dame at Disney/MGM Studios in Orlando, Florida. In 1997, Whiting moved to New York City and performed in numerous regional theatrical productions.

With a desire to create new works for the theater, Whiting began to find work as a director and choreographer.  He was hired as an assistant director for the national tours of Hairspray and The Producers, which is how he was introduced to Susan Stroman. In 2007, Stroman invited him to be assistant choreographer on the Broadway production of Young Frankenstein, marking Whiting's first Broadway credit. He went on to collaborate with Stroman on several other projects. He was assistant director and choreographer on Happiness at Lincoln Center
 
and was associate director/choreographer on The Scottsboro Boys, which received 12 Tony nominations. He was also Diane Paulus' associate director on the Broadway revival of Hair, which won the Tony Award for best musical revival. In 2013, Jeff was the Associate Director for Big Fish. In 2014, Jeff was the Associate Director for Bullets Over Broadway.

In addition to his work on Broadway, Whiting has directed numerous concerts and events. His work includes a series of concerts at Carnegie Hall with James Taylor (starring James Taylor, Bette Midler, Sting, Steve Martin and Tony Bennett) and "A Tribute to Susan Stroman" (co-hosted by Matthew Broderick and Nathan Lane and produced by The Vineyard Theatre). Opera credits include We Open In Paris at Glimmerglass Opera.

Whiting directed and choreographed the World Premiere production of Chasing Rainbows: Road to Oz, highlighting the life of Judy Garland, at Flatrock Playhouse in 2015.

Whiting delivered a TEDTalk on February 7, 2016 titled "Rising Beyond Limits with Open Jar Thinking" at Queens University in Kingston, Ontario. He has also directed and choreographed numerous events and shows for The Walt Disney Company in the USA, Brazil, Mexico and India.

Stage Write Software 
In 2012, Whiting released a software application for directors, choreographers and stage managers called Stage Write. According to members of the Broadway community, the app has revolutionized the task of documenting staging and choreography. It was lauded by the Society of Stage Directors and Choreographers as "the new standard in documentation" for directors and choreographers. The app is already in use on numerous Broadway productions, concert tours, television shows and films in production around the globe.  Apple featured StageWrite as part of their 'Life on iPad' campaign as was selected from over 140,000 apps to be featured.   Apple also featured the app during the 2013 Apple Keynote  and was mentioned by Apple CEO, Tim Cook, by saying "Honestly, we could never have imagined all of the ways that people are using the iPad.  Today we celebrate some of our customers creativity and genius of using their iPads…"

The Open Jar Institute 
In 2003, Whiting founded The Open Jar Institute, which allows young actors to train one-on-one with Broadway professionals. The institute provides workshops and masterclasses with professionals for students from around the world.Playbill feature on StageWriteApple Website Feature: StageWrite App

References

External links 
 
 Stage Write Software website
 The Open Jar Institute website
 
  (archive)
 

People from Denver
American choreographers
American theatre directors
1972 births
Living people